WBC may stand for:

Business
Westinghouse Broadcasting Company, a former large American broadcaster now folded into CBS
Westpac (New Zealand Exchange code: WBC), a multinational financial services company
Wholesale Broadband Connect, a UK internet provider
Workers Beer Company, a UK/Ireland organization providing event catering services

Government
War Bureau of Consultants, a 1941 US committee on biological warfare
West Berkshire Council, a UK local government district

Media
World Book Club, a radio programme on the BBC World Service
Worldview Broadcasting Channel, a Malaysian news channel
White Blood Cells (album), 2001, by the White Stripes
Warner Bros. Cartoons

Sports and competitions
S.V. Walking Boyz Company, a Surinamese association football club
BWF World Championships, a.k.a. World Badminton Championships
World Baseball Classic, an international tournament
World Basketball Challenge, an international competition
World Boxing Council
World Barista Championship, for coffee drink preparers
World Boardgaming Championships, an annual convention

Other uses
White blood cell, part of the immune system
WBC hive, a type of artificial beehive
Waterbeach railway station, station code WBC, in Cambridgeshire, England
Westboro Baptist Church, a small unaffiliated US church considered to be a hate group
 The Word Biblical Commentary, a series of analyses of the Bible